Activity-regulated cytoskeleton-associated protein is a plasticity protein that in humans is encoded by the ARC gene. It was first characterized in 1995. ARC is a member of the immediate-early gene (IEG) family, a rapidly activated class of genes functionally defined by their ability to be transcribed in the presence of protein synthesis inhibitors. ARC mRNA is localized to activated synaptic sites in an NMDA receptor-dependent manner, where the newly translated protein is believed to play a critical role in learning and memory-related molecular processes. Arc protein is widely considered to be important in neurobiology because of its activity regulation, localization, and utility as a marker for plastic changes in the brain. Dysfunction in the production of Arc protein has been implicated as an important factor in understanding various neurological conditions, including amnesia, Alzheimer's disease, Autism spectrum disorders, and Fragile X syndrome. Along with other IEGs such as ZNF268 and HOMER1, ARC is also a significant tool for systems neuroscience as illustrated by the development of the cellular compartment analysis of temporal activity by fluorescence in situ hybridization, or catFISH technique (see fluorescent in situ hybridization).

Gene 

The ARC gene, located on chromosome 15 in the mouse, chromosome 7 in the rat, and chromosome 8 in the human, is conserved across vertebrate species and has low sequence homology to spectrin, a cytoskeletal protein involved in forming the actin cellular cortex. A number of promoter and enhancer regions have been identified that mediate activity-dependent Arc transcription: a serum response element (SRE; see serum response factor) at ~1.5 kb upstream of the initiation site. a second SRE at ~6.5 kb; and a synaptic activity response element (SARE) sequence at ~7 kb upstream that contains binding sites for cyclic AMP response element-binding protein (CREB), myocyte enhancer factor 2 (MEF2), and SRF.

The 3' UTR of the mRNA contains a cis-acting element required for the localization of Arc to neuronal dendrites, as well as sites for two exon junction complexes (EJCs) that make Arc a natural target for nonsense mediated decay (NMD). Also important for translocation of cytoplasmic Arc mRNA to activated synapses is an 11 nucleotide binding site for heterogeneous nuclear ribonucleoprotein A2 (hnRNP A2).

It is suspected that Arc gene originated from Ty3/gypsy retrotransposons and was repurposed for mediating neuron-neuron communication.

Protein 

Once transported, the translated protein is 396 residues in length, with an N-terminus located at amino acids 1-25, a C-terminus at 155-396 (note that the spectrin homology located at 228-380 within the C-terminal), and a putative coiled coil domain at amino acids 26-154. Additionally, the protein has binding sites for endophilin 3 and dynamin 2 at amino acids 89-100 and 195-214, respectively. While Arc mRNA is subject to degradation by NMD, the translated protein contains a PEST sequence at amino acids 351-392, indicating proteasome-dependent degradation. The translated protein can be visualized with an immunoblot as a band at 55 kDa. The ARC protein can form virus-like capsids that package mRNA and can traffic between cells.

Trafficking

Following transcription, Arc mRNA is transported out of the nucleus and localized to neuronal dendrites and activated synapses, a process dependent on the 3' UTR, polymerization of actin, and ERK phosphorylation. The mRNA (and aggregate protein) is carried along microtubules radiating out from the nucleus by kinesin (specifically KIF5) and likely translocated into dendritic spines by the actin-based motor protein myosin-Va. Arc has been shown to be associated with polyribosomes at synaptic sites, and is translated in isolated synaptoneurosomal fractions in vitro indicating that the protein is likely locally translated in vivo.

Synaptically localized Arc protein interacts with dynamin and endophilin, proteins involved in clathrin-mediated endocytosis, and facilitates the removal of AMPA receptors from the plasma membrane. Consistent with this, increased Arc levels reduce AMPA currents, while Arc KOs display increases in surface AMPA expression.

Knockouts 

Arc is critical as a ubiquitous signaling factor in early embryonic development and is required for growth and patterning during gastrulation. The first knockouts (KOs) for Arc were therefore incompatible with life. Subsequent efforts produced homozygous knockout mice by targeting the entire Arc gene rather than portions of the coding region, eliminating dominant negative effects. These animals proved viable and exhibit no gross malformations in neuronal architecture, but express higher levels of the GluR1 subunit and increased miniature excitatory postsynaptic currents (mEPSCs) in addition to displaying deficiencies in long-term memory.

Signaling 

The Arc transcript is dependent upon activation of the mitogen-activated protein kinase or MAP kinase (MAPK) cascade, a pathway important for regulation of cell growth and survival. Extracellular signaling to neuronal dendrites activates postsynaptic sites to increase Arc levels through a wide variety of signaling molecules, including mitogens such as epidermal growth factor (EGF), nerve growth factor (NGF), and brain-derived neurotrophic factor (BDNF), glutamate acting at NMDA receptors, dopamine through activation of the D1 receptor subtype, and dihydroxyphenylglycine (DHPG). The common factor for these signaling molecules involves activation of cyclic-AMP and its downstream target protein kinase A (PKA). As such, direct pharmacological activation of cAMP by forskolin or 8-Br-cAMP robustly increases Arc levels while H89, a PKA antagonist, blocks these effects as does further downstream blockade of mitogen-activated protein kinase kinase [sic] (MEK). Note that the MAPK cascade is a signaling pathway involving multiple kinases acting sequentially [MAPKKK--> MAPKK--> MAPK].

MAPK is able to enter the nucleus and perform its phosphotransferase activity on a number of gene regulatory components that have implications for the regulation of immediate-early genes. Several transcription factors are known to be involved in regulating the Arc gene (see above), including serum response factor (SRF), CREB, MEF2, and zif268.

Behavioral effects 

Changes in Arc mRNA and/or protein are correlated with a number of behavioral changes including cued fear conditioning, contextual fear conditioning, spatial memory, operant conditioning, and inhibitory avoidance. The mRNA is notably upregulated following electrical stimulation in LTP-induction procedures such as high frequency stimulation (HFS), and is massively and globally induced by maximal electroconvulsive shock (MECS).

Arc in insects 
Meanwhile it has been found that Arc may have been acquired by animals more than once. While Arc seems to be closely related among all tetrapods, the one which has been found in fruit flies (Drosophila melanogaster), silkworms (Bombyx mori), and Argentine ants (Linepithema humile) may have been transferred to a common ancestor of these insects by another event.

References

External links 
 

Proteins
Molecular biology